This is a list of domestic and international non-governmental organisations (NGOs) operating in Kenya.

List

A
 African Conservation Centre
 African Wildlife Foundation
 Aga Khan Foundation
 Amici del Mondo World Friends Onlus
 Amref Health Africa
 Asante Africa Foundation

C
 Carolina for Kibera
 Cemiride

E
 East African Wildlife Society

F
 Family Health International
 Fauna and Flora International
 FEMNET
 The Fred Hollows Foundation
 Friends of Peoples Close to Nature

H
 HF Foundation
 Awareness Against Human Trafficking (HAART)

J
 Jamii Bora

K
 Kenya Human Rights Commission
 KOMAZA

S
SNV Netherlands Development Organisation

T 
 The Youth Cafe

References